Ondagona Baa is a 2003 Indian Kannada-language romance drama film directed by Udayasankar and produced by Rockline Venkatesh. The film stars V. Ravichandran and Shilpa Shetty. Yester-year veteran actors J. V. Somayajulu and K. R. Vijaya too feature in prominent roles. The film is a remake of the Telugu film Kalisundam Raa (2000). The film also marked the reunion of actor Ravichandran with music composer Hamsalekha who had parted ways due to some differences for many years.

The film created much hype before release due to the reunion of veterans on the screen after long time. Critics appreciated the film for its family based theme and decent music.

Cast 
 V. Ravichandran as Raghu
 Shilpa Shetty as Belli
 J. V. Somayajulu as Raghavayya
 K. R. Vijaya
 Tara
 Charan Raj
 Doddanna
 Mukhyamantri Chandru
 Sundar Raj
 Shivaram
 Vanitha Vasu
 Sathyapriya
 Pavitra Lokesh
 Pramila Joshai
 Chitra Shenoy
 Tennis Krishna
 M. N. Lakshmidevi
 Mandeep Roy
 Bank Janardhan

Soundtrack 
All the songs are composed and written by Hamsalekha.

Notes

References

External links 
 

2003 films
2000s Kannada-language films
Indian romantic drama films
Kannada remakes of Telugu films
Films scored by Hamsalekha
Films based on Romeo and Juliet
Rockline Entertainments films
2003 romantic drama films
Films directed by Udayasankar